Bilal Başaçıkoğlu (born 26 March 1995) is a professional footballer who plays as a winger for Turkish club Tuzlaspor. He formerly played for SC Heerenveen, Feyenoord and Kayserispor. Born in the Netherlands, he represented Turkey at under-21 international level.

International career
Başaçıkoğlu was born in the Netherlands to a Turkish father and a Moroccan mother. Initially, he represented the Netherlands as a youth. But in 2014, he decided to represent the home country of his father, Turkey, at international level for whom he played in their youth national teams afterwards. In November 2016 Başaçıkoğlu received his first call-up to the senior Turkey squad for the match against Kosovo.

Honours
Feyenoord
 Eredivisie: 2016–17
 KNVB Cup: 2015–16, 2017–18
 Johan Cruijff Shield: 2017

Trabzonspor
Turkish Cup: 2019–20

References

External links
 
 
 
 Voetbal International profile 
 Netherlands U18 profile at OnsOranje
 Netherlands U19 profile at OnsOranje

1995 births
Living people
Footballers from Zaanstad
Dutch sportspeople of Moroccan descent
Turkish people of Moroccan descent
Dutch people of Turkish descent
Dutch footballers
Netherlands youth international footballers
Turkish footballers
Turkey youth international footballers
Turkey under-21 international footballers
Association football wingers
SC Heerenveen players
Feyenoord players
Kayserispor footballers
Trabzonspor footballers
Gaziantep F.K. footballers
Heracles Almelo players
Tuzlaspor players
Eredivisie players
Süper Lig players
TFF First League players